Robert Tamale known popularly as Bobby Tamale is a Ugandan film actor and producer. He broke through his acting career through "It Can't Be", a TV drama Airing on WBS TV. He has also starred with his first lead role as Davis in the 2016 Ugandan film The Only Son. He is also the executive producer of the movie. The film was nominated in six categories at the 2016 Uganda Film Festival including Best Screenplay, Best Sound, Best Editing, Film of the Year, Best lead Actor and Best Feature Film. Bobby has also been Executive producer to Tiktok and Love Faces (film) both directed by Usama Mukwaya.

References

External links
 

1984 births
Living people
Ugandan film producers
Ugandan male film actors